HMS Electra was a Clydebank-built, three-funnelled, 30-knot destroyer ordered by the Royal Navy under the 1895–1896 Naval Estimates.  She was the fourth ship to carry this name since it was introduced in 1806 for a 16-gun brig-sloop.

Construction
She was laid down as yard number 289 on 18 October 1895, at J & G Thompson shipyard in Clydebank, and launched on 14 July 1896. During her builder's trials, she had problems attaining her contract speed. She was completed and accepted by the Royal Navy in July 1900.

Service
After commissioning Electra was assigned to the Chatham Division of the Harwich Flotilla. She was deployed in home waters for her entire service life. The destroyer took part in the fleet review held at Spithead on 16 August 1902 for the coronation of King Edward VII.

On 30 August 1912 the Admiralty directed all destroyer classes were to be designated by letters. After 30 September 1913, she was known as a C-class destroyer and had the letter ‘C’ painted on the hull below the bridge area and on either the fore or aft funnel.

With the outbreak of hostilities in August 1914 she was assigned to the Nore Local Flotilla. Her duties included anti-submarine and counter-mining patrols in the Thames Estuary.

In 1919 she was paid off and laid-up in reserve awaiting disposal. She was sold on 29 April 1920 to Barking Ship Breaking Company for breaking.

Pennant numbers

References

Bibliography

External links
 http://www.gwpda.org/naval/s0420000.htm
 http://www.dreadnoughtproject.org/tfs/index.php/H.M.S._Electra_(1896)

 

Ships built on the River Clyde
1896 ships
C-class destroyers (1913)
World War I destroyers of the United Kingdom